The following is the list of islands of North Dakota. North Dakota is a landlocked state in the Upper Midwest. With only 2.4% of the state being water, there are few lakes for islands to be found. North Dakota has few named islands due to the lack of water bodies. Most islands are found in large reservoirs or the in the Missouri River. Following the damming of the Missouri River, some islands were flooded and ceased to exist. They are still listed, but as historical only. There are other islands in North Dakota, however many are unnamed.

Current Islands
List of named islands of North Dakota. Most islands are found in reservoirs including Lake Metigoshe and Lake Sakakawea, which was formed by damming the Missouri River.

Former Islands
List of former islands of North Dakota. These islands are historical and do not exist anymore. They were located in the Missouri River before the water level was raised by the construction of the Oahe Dam and the Garrison Dam by the United States Army Corps of Engineers.

See also
List of islands of the Midwestern United States
Geography of North Dakota

References

North Dakota